The voiced labial–velar nasal is a type of consonantal sound, used in some spoken languages.

The labial–velar nasal is found in West and Central Africa and eastern New Guinea.

Features
Features of the voiced labial–velar nasal:

Occurrence

Rounded variant
Some languages, especially in Vanuatu, combine this labial–velar nasal with a labial–velar approximant release, hence .

In the Banks Islands languages which have it, the phoneme  is written  in local orthographies, using a macron on the corresponding bilabial.
In other languages of Vanuatu further south (such as South Efate, or Lenakel), the same segment is spelled  with a combining tilde.

See also
 List of phonetics topics
 Doubly articulated consonant

Notes

References

External links
 

Nasal consonants
Labial–velar consonants
Voiced consonants
Pulmonic consonants